The North–South Corridor Project is a major proposal to upgrade and extend land transport links (road and rail) in Southern Africa.

Projects

Rail 

 TAZARA – rehabilitation
 Kapiri Mposhi – Chingola – rehabilitation
 Bulawayo – Victoria Falls – rehabilitation

See also

 AfricaRail
 East African Railway Master Plan

References

Transport in South Africa